Pterolophia truncatella is a species of beetle in the family Cerambycidae. It was described by Stephan von Breuning in 1943.

References

truncatella
Beetles described in 1943